Mark Daly (23 August 1887 – 27 September 1957) was a British film actor.

Daly was born in Edinburgh, Scotland, on 23 August 1887, making his first stage appearance in Swansea, Wales, in 1906. Six years later, in 1912, he made his first London stage appearance at the Shaftesbury Theatre. For three years, he was the principal comedian at The Fred Karno Company, a collection of comedians who worked in both British variety and American vaudeville. Other "Karno Comedians" included Charlie Chaplin and Billie Ritchie. During his time as an actor, Daly took part in excess of 25 motion pictures before his death on 27 September 1957 in England.

Filmography 

 East Lynne on the Western Front (1931) – Maurice / Levison
 The Beggar Student (1931) – Sergeant
 The Third String (1932) – Pete Russett
 Doss House (1933) – Shoeblack
 The Private Life of Henry VIII (1933) – Bit Part (uncredited)
 A Cuckoo in the Nest (1933) – Pinhorn
 Up for the Derby (1933) – Jerry Higgs
 Say It with Flowers (1934) – Scotty MacDonald
 The River Wolves (1934) – Jock Brodie
 Music Hall (1934) – Scotty
 Bypass to Happiness (1934) – Wallop
 There Goes Susie (1934) – Sunshine
 Flood Tide (1934) – Scotty
 Open All Night (1934)
 A Real Bloke (1935) – Scotty
 That's My Uncle (1935) – Walter Frisbee
 Jubilee Window (1935) – Dave
 The Ghost Goes West (1935) – Murdoch's Groom
 Music Hath Charms (1935) – Ship's Captain (uncredited)
 The Small Man (1936) – Scotty
 The Man Who Could Work Miracles (1936) – Toddy Beamish
 Southern Roses (1936) – MacDougal (uncredited)
 Hearts of Humanity (1936) – Carbolic
 The Captain's Table (1936) – Saunders
 Shipmates o' Mine (1936) – Andrew McFee
 Murder at the Cabaret (1936) – (uncredited)
 Good Morning, Boys (1937) – Arty Jones
 Wings of the Morning (1937) – James Patrick Aloysius 'Jimmy' Brannigan
 Wanted! (1937) – Mr. Smithers
 The Lilac Domino (1937) – (uncredited)
 Knight Without Armour (1937) – Hospital Orderly (uncredited)
 Command Performance (1937) – Joe
 Captain's Orders (1937) – Scotty
 Follow Your Star (1938) – The Property Man
 Lassie from Lancashire (1938) – Dad
 Break the News (1938) – Shorty
 Q Planes (1939) – John – Factory Watchman (uncredited)
 Contraband (1940) – Taxi Driver (uncredited)
 Hoots Mon! (1940) – Campbell
 Ten Days in Paris (1940) – (uncredited)
 The Girl in the News (1940) – Taxi Driver (uncredited)
 The Farmer's Wife (1941) – P. C. Chave
 The Big Blockade (1942) – Driver (uncredited)
 The Next of Kin (1942) – Corporal on Train (uncredited)
 The Voyage of Peter Joe (1946) – Nobby
 Bonnie Prince Charlie (1948) – Ian MacQueen (uncredited)
 The Romantic Age (1949) – Withers
 Three Bags Full (1949) – Nobby
 The Card (1952) – Mayor (uncredited)
 Alf's Baby (1953) – Will Donkin
 Don't Blame the Stork (1954) – Michael O'Connor
 Lease of Life (1954) – Spooner
 Delavine Affair (1955) – Mr. Bissett
 Footsteps in the Fog (1955)
 The Feminine Touch (1956) – Gardener (uncredited)
 The Gelignite Gang (1956) – Carter, 1ST Watchman
 Keep It Clean (1956) – Stage Door Keeper
 You Pay Your Money (1957) – Goodwin
 The Tommy Steele Story (1957) – Junkshop Man (uncredited)
 The Shiralee (1957) – Sam
 The Story of Esther Costello (1957) – Billy (uncredited)
 Soapbox Derby (1958) – Grandpa (final film role)

References

External links 
 

1887 births
1957 deaths
British male film actors
British male stage actors
Male actors from Edinburgh
20th-century British male actors
20th-century British comedians
British male comedy actors